William Van Duzer Lawrence IV (born December 26, 1968) is an American television producer, screenwriter, and director. He is the creator of the series Scrubs and co-creator of shows including Cougar Town, Spin City, Ground Floor, Ted Lasso, Shrinking, and the short-lived animated series Clone High, in which he also voiced the leader of the shadowy figures. He has written for many other shows, including The Nanny and Boy Meets World.

The name of Lawrence's production company, Doozer, is a wordplay on his middle name.

Career 

Lawrence is a graduate of the College of William & Mary, where he studied English and was a member of Kappa Alpha (KA) social fraternity. After graduating, his first writing job was as a staff writer on the short-lived ABC sitcom Billy. He briefly wrote for Boy Meets World (during which he claims to have named the character Topanga Lawrence), Friends, and The Nanny. In 1996, he wrote for the short-lived sitcom Champs.

Lawrence's first show as creator was the ABC multi-camera sitcom Spin City, co-created with Champs creator Gary David Goldberg, which originally starred Michael J. Fox as a deputy mayor of New York City. The show lasted for six seasons and won a Primetime Emmy Award and four Golden Globes.

He went on to create the single-camera sitcom Scrubs, which followed the lives of hospital staff. The show premiered in 2001 and ran for 9 seasons in total, 7 on NBC and 2 on ABC. Lawrence wrote, produced and directed the series. The show received critical acclaim, and won a Peabody Award in 2006, and two Emmy Awards with 17 nominations.

His next project was co-creating the 2002 animated sitcom Clone High for MTV with Phil Lord and Chris Miller. The show lasted a single 13-episode season. In 2005, Lawrence co-created the failed The WB pilot Nobody's Watching with Neil Goldman and Garrett Donovan. Lawrence was preparing for his film-directing debut with the film Fletch Won, a prequel to the previous Fletch films, but ultimately left the project after Scrubs star Zach Braff exited the project.

Lawrence co-created the single-camera sitcom Cougar Town, which premiered in 2009 on ABC, with Kevin Biegel. The show is executive produced by series star Courteney Cox and her then-husband David Arquette. Courteney Cox had been a guest star on Lawrence's previous sitcom Scrubs. The show ran from 2009 to 2012 on ABC, then moved to TBS in 2013.

In 2013, Lawrence was involved with three shows that made it to series. He co-created and executive produces the TBS sitcom Ground Floor with Greg Malins. He is also an executive producer of the Fox sitcom Surviving Jack and the NBC sitcom Undateable. After running two seasons, Ground Floor was cancelled. In 2014, Lawrence and four other cast members from Undateable did a standup comedy tour to promote the show. Undateable was cancelled in 2016 after three seasons.

Lawrence wrote a script for the Rush Hour TV series, though it was ultimately canceled, after a single season.

In 2017, Lawrence started developing a new multi-camera comedy series called Spaced Out, a show set in the world of commercial space travel. Lawrence is an executive producer for Whiskey Cavalier, described as an action dramedy starring Scott Foley and Lauren Cohan, which was ordered to series at ABC but canceled after 10 episodes.

Lawrence co-created the Apple TV+ series Ted Lasso, which premiered in 2020 and has gone on to win two Primetime Emmy Awards for Outstanding Comedy Series. In 2022, Lawrence signed a new five-year overall deal with Warner Bros. Television Group through 2028.

Personal life 
His first wife was television actress Megyn Price. Lawrence married actress Christa Miller in 1999. They have three children together. Miller has been cast in Lawrence projects Scrubs, Clone High, Cougar Town, and Shrinking.

Lawrence is the great-great grandson of Sarah and William Van Duzer Lawrence, whose home became Sarah Lawrence College.

On July 21, 2017, Lawrence was involved in a plane crash on the East River in New York City with his family. Everyone aboard survived unscathed.

Filmography

Television

References

External links 
"'Scrubs,' Near Death, Is Given a Miracle Cure" in The New York Times

1968 births
Living people
American people of Dutch descent
American people of English descent
People from Ridgefield, Connecticut
Lawrence family
Showrunners
Scrubs (TV series)
American television writers
American male television writers
American television directors
Television producers from Connecticut
College of William & Mary alumni
Screenwriters from Connecticut
20th-century American screenwriters
20th-century American male writers
21st-century American screenwriters
21st-century American male writers
Primetime Emmy Award winners